MBC Group, is a Saudi media conglomerate based in the Middle East and North Africa region. Launched in London in 1991, the company moved to its headquarters to Dubai in 2002 then moved to Riyadh in 2022.

MBC Group operates over 17 free-to-air satellite TV channels, and a video on demand service (Shahid). MBC was the first broadcaster to provide a satellite-based free-to-air 24-hour television broadcasting network across the Arab world. The Group's current chairman is Waleed bin Ibrahim Al Ibrahim. Sam Barnett returned as MBC Group CEO in December 2020 after a one-year departure. MBC's television arm, MBC TV, broadcasts via Eutelsat, Arabsat and Nilesat satellites. MBC has more than 2,000 staff.

In recent years MBC has been hit with major rounds of financial cuts, leading to 150 layoffs and major production cuts. These cuts were driven in part due to advertising not covering production costs and the failure to acquire exclusive rights to the Saudi league. As of 2011 MBC reported 165 million viewers.

TV channels and services
All MBC channels are free-to-air except for the HD channels and MBC Plus Variety. They are available on OSN, STC TV & STC TV Home IPTV and my-HD satellite service. They are all Pay-TV service providers in the Middle East.

MBC1

Launched in 1991 as the first independent free-to-air pan-Arab channel, MBC1 is the leading channel in MENA region for family entertainment.

MBC2

The first free-to-air movie channel in the Arab world, MBC 2 offers a 24-hour non-stop stream of Hollywood movies, from blockbusters to classics and international films. This channel is censored to not show violence and pornography, including deep kiss, fetishism, eroticas, and nudity—all forms have been cut.

MBC3

MBC 3 is a children's entertainment channel which delivers a programming mix of children's education and entertainment for Arab kids aged between three and thirteen. MBC3 also airs a locally produced reality show for kids, Eish Safari, which recruits young Arab kids and sets them on a month-long trip of mental and physical challenges. Recently, the channel produced a new game show called "Graduate in a Day", similar in concept to "Who Wants To Be A Millionaire" for children and their parents.

MBC4

MBC 4 is aimed primarily at Middle Eastern women and offers a broad mixture of US and UK shows, comedy and drama series, as well as gameshows, magazines, plus news and current affairs programming, in addition to Turkish, Pakistani and Mexican dramas dubbed into Arabic. It also airs original Arabic programs.

MBC5
A channel dedicated to family entertainment which was launched on 21 September 2019. Targeting Maghrébines countries generally, and Moroccan viewers specifically.

MBC ACTION

A channel that targets young Arab males. It delivers Western series, movies, action reality shows as well as Japanese anime and sports programs. Some of its prime time shows include The Mentalist, The Vampire Diaries, Fringe, Supernatural, V, WWE and True Blood. The channel recently which is a weekly "magazine" format show about cars, similar to Top Gear, which they also broadcast the British and American versions of the BBC's Top Gear.

MBC DRAMA

One of the latest additions to the Group, which was officially launched on 27 November 2010. It is a family channel, with 24/7 Arabic drama series. The launch coincides with the Group's 20th anniversary, and marks our 10th channel launch. The channel runs a variety of different dramas: Egyptian, Syrian, Bedouin, Gulf And Kuwaiti dramas that are 1st runs and exclusive runs. MBC Drama is distinguished by the two additional repeats throughout the day, offering its viewers the choice of time, based on their various lifestyles and viewership trends. Do not confuse this channel with MBC's subscription-based channel MBC+ Drama.

MBC MAX

The MBC Group's second 24-hour movie channel which caters to a younger audience. The channel airs Western, comedy, action, romance and drama movies as well as classic.

MBC BOLLYWOOD

MBC launched MBC Bollywood on 26 October 2013. MBC Bollywood is MBC Group's 14th channel, and it is aimed to air 24 hours of hindi cinema, either subtitled in Arabic, targeting South Asian audiences, and Arab Bollywood enthusiasts.

MBC PERSIA

This channel was launched on 9 July 2008 and provides Persian language contents. The channel is dedicated to Iranian viewers and screens films and programs around the world.

MBC MASR

MBC launched MBC MASR on 9 November 2012, and it is a division of MBC studios situated in Egypt and targeting Egyptian viewers.

MBC MASR2
This channel was the two hours time-shifted service, but now it's a second channel for Egypt and has a different content.

MBC IRAQ
Launched in February 2019, MBC IRAQ is a premium channel aimed at the entire Iraqi family. Programmes focus on localised, Iraqi productions in drama, comedy and socio-cultural premium entertainment shows.

MBC FM and Panorama FM
These radio stations are the MBC Group's Arabic radio stations in Saudi that broadcast music, talk shows, competitions and local coverage of events and news. MBC FM plays local and Gulf music while Panorama FM delivers contemporary Arabic and Western tunes.

Wanasah

A 24-hour music channel that targets the Arab youth, mainly in Eastern Arabia. The channel offers music videos, concerts, music & lifestyle programs as well as series.

MBC.net
One of the Arabic entertainment web portals in the region with a mix of sports, entertainment, movies and music content, along with its user interactivity and social networking features.

Shahid

The first free "video on demand" service in the Arab region, with the biggest streaming library of Arabic content. Shahid is the largest premium VOD service in the world outside of China, the US, and India. Shahid offers a catalogue of MBC's own shows, as well as dubbed or subtitled foreign content. In January 2020, it was announced Shahid partnered with Disney and Fox to bring more than 3,000 hours of content, including Star Wars, Marvel, and such Disney classics as Frozen. The Service also announced 9 Arabic originals.

MBC Hope
MBC Hope was launched in June 2013 to handle the consumer social relationship elements of MBC. This initiative launched campaigns such as "Syrians without an address" and "Stars on board". In 2017 MBC Hope was expanded to Egypt, with a goal to support female entrepreneurs.

MBC+ Variety
It is a 24-hour entertainment channel that airs Western variety content. The channel is now exclusively on Arabsat, My-HD platform.

Controversy
In 2017, a number of owners and board members of MBC were summoned to Riyadh where they were arrested, accused of corruption, and locked in the Ritz-Carlton. These moves came following years of the Saudi Crown Prince attempting to purchase the media company. After 83 days the company's chief owner Waleed al-Ibrahim was released. A "senior MBC executive" was cited by Arabian Business stating that Waleed al-Ibrahim was found innocent of any wrongdoing.

In 2007, MBC began airing its first Turkish soap opera dubbed into another language. Over the next few years these programs became a major success for MBC, with over 85 million viewing the finale of Gümüş. In 2018, MBC moved to remove all Turkish programming from their channels, no official reason were given.

In 2019, MBC Masr came under scrutiny for its use of blackface in comedy programming. Popular Egyptian comedian Shaimaa Seif has done a number of programs on MBC using blackface and stereotypes for humor.

Some have raised concern of the amount of American advertisements on MBC channels, with some studies suggesting over 50% of advertising time is devoted towards American products such as those from Johnson & Johnson, Kellogg's, and PepsiCo. These critics state that this leads to cultural imperialism and erodes at the native cultures of areas in the Middle East and North Africa. In a study focused on Algerian consumer preferences, it was found that these consumers were drawn to American advertisements and products advertised on MBC. This in turn led Algerian companies to mimic the advertising style and aesthetic of American companies.

Use of technology
In 2010, MBC Max provided the ability to watch English movies with Arabic voices, along with watching English movies (English voices) with or without Arabic subtitles.

In July 2011, MBC launched 7 of its channels in HD which includes MBC 1, MBC 2, MBC 3, MBC 4, MBC Action, MBC Max, and MBC Drama. These HD versions of these channels are encrypted using Conax while SD are FTA.

In 2017, Snapchat expanded its "Discover" feature to provide content from regional providers including MBC.

Criticism
On 17 September 2013, the Anti-Defamation League criticized the network for using a clip of the 2009 film Inglourious Basterds in which the Adolf Hitler character was speaking to other Nazis, with the subtitles replaced with advertisements for the network. The League said "The use of such imagery contributes to the trivialization of and desensitization to the unparalleled horrors of the Holocaust."

References

External links
 

Middle East Broadcasting Center
1991 establishments in the United Kingdom
Mass media companies established in 1991
Arab mass media
Direct broadcast satellite services
Television networks